Prestegårdsskogen Nature Reserve is a nature reserve on the southern side of the island of Engeløya in the municipality of Steigen in Nordland county, Norway. It is a heavily hazel-forested area; other than a few far smaller exceptions, it is the northernmost known hazel forest. Various other species find their northernmost extent here.

References

External links
Maps 

Steigen
Nature reserves in Norway
Protected areas of Nordland
Protected areas established in 2000
2000 establishments in Norway